Priero is one of 28 parishes (administrative divisions) in Salas, a municipality within the province and autonomous community of Asturias, in northern Spain.

Villages
Priero (Prieru) 
El Tárano (El Táranu) 
Las Centiniegas (Las Cintiniegas)
El Toural (El Toural) 
Daner

References

Parishes in Salas